Brown Peak (or Brown Peaks) may refer to:

 One of the 7 mountains in the United States listed by the USGS GNIS:

 Brown Peak (Sturge Island), the highest point of the Balleny Islands in Antarctica
 Brown Peaks, a series of low peaks surmounting the Amundsen Glacier in Antarctica
 Rudmose Brown Peak, a peak southwest of Mount Hurley in Antarctica

See also
 Brown Mountain (disambiguation)
 Mount Brown (disambiguation)